Aundray Bruce (born April 30, 1966) is a former American football player. He played outside linebacker and tight end as a pro. As a college football player he played defensive end at Auburn University before playing for the Atlanta Falcons and Los Angeles/Oakland Raiders of the NFL. The Falcons selected Bruce first overall in the 1988 NFL Draft.

Early years
Bruce was born in Montgomery, Alabama.  He attended George Washington Carver High School in Montgomery. A high school phenom, Bruce started at tight end and outside linebacker. He also returned kicks and played four additional positions on offense (quarterback, running back, wide receiver, offensive tackle) and four other positions on defense (defensive tackle, defensive end, nose guard, cornerback). While he excelled in football, basketball was Bruce's first love. He led George Washington Carver High School to the 4-A basketball state championship in both his junior and senior years. As a senior, he was named the state tournament's MVP and won an All-Star game dunk contest.

College career
Bruce was named All-Southeastern Conference in 1986 and 1987, All-America in 1987, and Citrus Bowl MVP in 1987.  He first garnered national attention in a nationally televised game in 1987 against Georgia Tech by intercepting three passes and returning one for a touchdown and making 10 unassisted tackles. Entering the NFL Draft, he was saddled with expectations of becoming the next Lawrence Taylor, though once drafted was described as "unquestionably the least heralded No. 1 draft choice this decade." He graduated from Auburn in 1988 as an education major.

Professional career
Bruce was drafted with the first overall pick in the 1988 NFL Draft by the Atlanta Falcons. Bruce enjoyed his most prominent role on the Falcons 1991 playoff team when he saw spot duty on offense as a tight end as well as defense.  He signed with the Los Angeles Raiders as a free agent in 1992 and finished his career with the organization. Bruce played in 151 games over his 11-season career, posting 32 sacks and 4 interceptions. While Bruce concluded his career with a 7-season tenure in Oakland, he is typically regarded as a draft bust. Despite being the #1 overall pick, he never made an All-Pro or Pro Bowl team, never had double-figure sack totals in a season, and only started 42 games. He only played for two playoff teams in his long career.  To this day, no other team has selected a linebacker with the #1 pick in the draft.

NFL career statistics

Coaching career
Bruce is currently a defensive line coach for the Faulkner University Eagles in Montgomery, Alabama.

References

External links
Aundray Bruce stats at DatabaseFootball.com

1966 births
Living people
All-American college football players
American football defensive ends
American football linebackers
Atlanta Falcons players
Players of American football from Montgomery, Alabama
Auburn Tigers football players
Los Angeles Raiders players
National Football League first-overall draft picks
Oakland Raiders players